Simon Craig Russell (born 19 March 1985) is a retired English professional footballer who played as a midfielder.

He previously played in the Football League for Hull City and Kidderminster Harriers before moving into Non-League with York City, Tamworth, Cambridge United, Lincoln City, Alfreton Town and North Ferriby United and Gainsborough Trinity.

Career
Born in Hull, East Riding of Yorkshire, Russell began his career as a trainee at Hull City. He made his first-team debut after coming on as a 60th minute substitute in a Football League Trophy match against Port Vale on 22 October 2002, which was lost 3–1. He made his league debut in the Third Division in a 4–1 victory against Kidderminster Harriers on 26 April 2003. He made no appearances for Hull's first team during the 2003–04 season, but helped the reserve team win the East Riding Senior Cup after scoring in the final, which finished 3–0. He was released by Hull in the summer of 2004 after making two substitute appearances for the club, and was signed by League Two club Kidderminster in July 2004 on a two-year contract, whose manager Jan Mølby described him as, "... [having] a tremendous engine and is likely to pop up with a goal or two."

He finished his first season aft Kidderminster with 29 appearances and 2 goals as they were relegated to the Conference National. He received a broken wrist in November 2005 that ruled him out for three months of 2005–06, but made his return after two months when he featured as a 63rd-minute substitute against Altrincham on 2 January 2006. He finished the season with 35 appearances and 2 goals. After making 52 appearances and scoring 6 goals in 2006–07, he signed a new one-year contract with the club, which saw him become their longest serving current player. He picked up a thigh injury that ruled him out of the beginning of 2007–08 and returned to action in a 3–1 victory against Droylsden on 18 September 2007. He finished the season with 36 appearances and 6 goals.

Having made three appearances for Kidderminster up to that point in 2008–09, Russell signed for fellow Conference Premier club York City on a free transfer on 22 August 2008. He made his debut a day later as a 54th-minute substitute in a 2–2 draw against Northwich Victoria. He suffered from a tight hamstring during York's match against Grays Athletic in December, which resulted in him missing the Histon match. He scored his first goal for York directly from a corner kick in a 3–1 defeat to Barrow in the Conference League Cup on 20 January 2009. He came on as a substitute in the 2009 FA Trophy Final at Wembley Stadium on 9 May 2009, which York lost 2–0 to Stevenage Borough. Russell turned down loan moves to two Conference North clubs in September 2009, as he wanted to stay and fight for his place at York.

He joined York's Conference Premier rivals Tamworth on 17 September 2009 on a one-month loan, after failing to play any matches for York up to that point in 2009–10. The loan was extended until 1 January 2010 in October. He returned to York on 19 December 2009 and joined Cambridge United on loan until the end of 2009–10 on 22 January 2010. He made his debut in a 1–0 defeat to Crawley Town on 6 February 2010. He returned to York at the end of the season after making 17 appearances on loan at Cambridge, and manager Martin Ling said Russell would be offered a permanent contract by the club if he was to be released by York. He re-signed for Cambridge permanently on a two-year contract on 10 May. Russell started 2010–11 in fine form for Cambridge, scoring his first goal in the 2–2 home draw against Crawley on 17 August and adding four more to lead the club's goalscoring charts in November.

Russell signed for newly relegated Conference Premier club Lincoln City on 20 July 2011 on a one-year contract after he was made available by Cambridge. He finished 2011–12 with 30 appearances and 1 goal for Lincoln before signing for Alfreton Town on a one-year contract on 13 July 2012. He signed for Conference North club Gainsborough Trinity on a free transfer on 10 January 2013.

Russell signed for newly promoted National League club North Ferriby United on 14 June 2016. In January 2018 Russel re-joined Gainsborough Trinity.

Russell signed for Tadcaster Albion ahead of the 2020–21 season. In June 2022, Russell announced his retirement.

Career statistics

References

External links

Simon Russell profile at the North Ferriby United A.F.C. website

1985 births
Living people
Footballers from Kingston upon Hull
English footballers
Association football midfielders
Hull City A.F.C. players
Kidderminster Harriers F.C. players
York City F.C. players
Tamworth F.C. players
Cambridge United F.C. players
Lincoln City F.C. players
Alfreton Town F.C. players
Gainsborough Trinity F.C. players
North Ferriby United A.F.C. players
Tadcaster Albion A.F.C. players
English Football League players
National League (English football) players